Ardesio is a comune in the province of Bergamo, in Lombardy, Italy.

Events

On the last Sunday of January people in Ardesio have a goat and donkey exhibition. In this exhibition you can find every kind of goats and donkeys.  
 
Every 31 January there is "La scasada dol zenerù" (the chasing of January). On this day they celebrate the end of the cold season. A puppet representing January is burnt at the city hall.

On 23 June people celebrate the anniversary of the Virgin apparition. This event commemorates two girls seeing the Virgin Mary in 1607. A procession is held with a statue representing the Virgin, the two girls and the baby Jesus.

Bounding communes

Valgoglio
Gromo
Oltressenda Alta
Villa d'Ogna
Parre
Premolo
Oltre il Colle
Roncobello
Branzi

References

External links
 
Official website 
Ethnographic Museum of Ardesio and Alta Valseriana
Coat of arms of Ardesio

Cities and towns in Lombardy